Neville Furlong (10 July 1968 – 26 September 2017) was an Irish rugby union international player who played as a winger.

Furlong initially played Gaelic football, and was selected at both minor and under- 90 levels. He attended University College Galway, where he developed an interest in hurling and played for the university team as well as for Connacht. He was an Irish Army captain.

Furlong played for the Ireland team in 1992, winning 2 caps during the 1992 Ireland tour of New Zealand. He scored one try for Ireland in his second test match against New Zealand on 6 June 1992 which happened to be the last four point try scored in international rugby as the sport changed its scoring system later in 1992.

Furlong died on 26 September 2017 following a long battle against cancer.

References

External links
ESPN Profile

1968 births
2017 deaths
Alumni of the University of Galway
Connacht Rugby players
Deaths from cancer
Gaelic footballers who switched code
Irish Army officers
Irish rugby union players
Ireland international rugby union players
University of Galway RFC players
Wexford Gaelic footballers
Rugby union wings